Anthony Robert Gizzo (August 4, 1902 – April 1, 1953) was a Kansas City, Missouri mobster with the Cosa Nostra and a boss of the Kansas City crime family.

Gizzo was born in New York City and was known as "Tony". In the early 1920s, after being arrested on a narcotics charge, Gizzo attempted to bribe a federal officer with $10,000 ($ today). Gizzo was convicted and in 1924 served one year and a day at Leavenworth Federal Penitentiary in Leavenworth, Kansas.

Gizzo was a close friend of mobster Charles Binaggio. In 1930, Gizzo and Binaggio were arrested in Denver, Colorado, on a minor charge. During this time, both men were lieutenants to Kansas City North End political boss John Lazia in his illegal gambling operations. Gizzo soon became known as one of the five "Iron Men" due to his underworld clout. 

In 1950, with Binaggio's murder, it is believed that Gizzo assumed leadership of the Kansas City family.

Kefauver Committee
Gizzo testified in Kansas City before the U.S. Senate Kefauver Committee in its investigations of organized crime. At one point, a senator asked Gizzo if he belonged to the Mafia. Gizzo replied,
 
What is the Mafia? I don’t even know what the Mafia is.

Later on, Gizzo had the following exchange with the Committee when asked if he knew Balestrere:

"Yes, sir", Gizzo replied.
"He is rather widely known as a prominent man in the Mafia, isn’t he?" asked the committee.
"That’s what you hear," said Gizzo.
"What did you hear?" questioned the committee.
"The same thing that you just said there", answered Gizzo. 

On April 1, 1953 Gizzo died of a heart attack in Dallas, Texas. He is buried in Calvary Cemetery in Kansas City, Missouri.

References

"The Mafia Made Easy" by Peter J. Devico, Peter J. De Vico

External links
The American Mafia: Crime Bosses of Kansas City
American Mafia: The Five Iron Men of Kansas City by Allan May

American crime bosses
American gangsters of Italian descent
Kansas City crime family
1902 births
1953 deaths